Leucocythere helenae is a species of crustacean in the family Limnocytheridae. It is endemic to South Africa.

References

Limnocytheridae
Freshwater crustaceans of Africa
Endemic crustaceans of South Africa
Taxonomy articles created by Polbot
Crustaceans described in 1991